Myus, sometimes Myous or Myos, was an ancient Greek city in Caria. It was one of twelve major settlements of the Ionian League. The city was said to have been founded by Cyaretus (sometimes called Cydrelus), a son of Codrus. Myus was located on a small peninsula at the coast of the Aegean Sea, but it now lies inland due to the sediment deposited by the Maeander River over many centuries. The site of the city lies north of the modern village Avşar in the Söke district of Aydın Province, Turkey

Myus was synoikised with Miletus.  Myus had both a temple of Athena and a temple of Herodotus and sources tell us that it was always secondary to Miletos. Instigated by Aristagoras of Miletus, the Ionian Revolt broke out here. It was the beginning of the Greco-Persian Wars.

It was the smallest among the twelve Ionian cities, and in the days of Strabo the population was so reduced that they did not form a political community, but became incorporated with Miletus, whither in the end the Myusians transferred themselves, abandoning their own town altogether. This last event happened, according to Pausanias, on account of the great number of flies which annoyed the inhabitants; but it was more probably on account of the frequent inundations to which the place was exposed. Myus was one of the three towns given to Themistocles by the Persian king. During the Peloponnesian War the Athenians experienced a check near this place from the Carians. Philip II of Macedonia, who had obtained possession of Myus, ceded it to the Magnesians. The only edifice noticed by the ancients at Myus was a temple of Dionysus, built of white marble.

See also 
 List of ancient Greek cities

References

Ancient Greek archaeological sites in Turkey
Ionian League
Former populated places in Turkey
Buildings and structures in Aydın Province
History of Aydın Province
Greek city-states
Populated places in ancient Caria
Söke District